Christine "Chris" Clark (born October 10, 1962, in Butte, Montana) is a retired female long-distance runner from the United States, who competed for her native country at the 2000 Summer Olympics in Sydney, Australia. There she ended up in 19th place in the women's marathon race.  By virtue of winning the Olympic Trials, she was also the 2000 United States National Champion in the Marathon.

Achievements

References

External links
 
 
 
Christine Clark 2000 Olympic Women's Marathon Trials
 Sports Illustrated marathon coverage
 The New York Times Company coverage Christine Clark  profile
 Runners World Chris Clark Broke Through - A poster-woman for treadmill training

1962 births
Living people
American female long-distance runners
Athletes (track and field) at the 2000 Summer Olympics
Olympic track and field athletes of the United States
Sportspeople from Butte, Montana
Track and field athletes from Montana
21st-century American women